Tsentralnoye is a rural locality (a selo) and the administrative center of Tsentralny Selsoviet, Rodinsky District, Altai Krai, Russia. The population was 524 as of 2013. There are 12 streets.

Geography 
Voznesenka is the nearest rural locality.

References 

Rural localities in Rodinsky District